Sivakumar Jayakumar  (born 12 August 1977), known professionally by his mononym Siva or also as Siruthai Siva, is an Indian film director, screenwriter, lyricist and cinematographer who works primarily in Tamil cinema.

Siva started his film career as a cinematographer for several Tamil, Telugu and Malayalam films. He then pursued his career as a film director and screenwriter in Telugu cinema with Souryam (2008) superhit, which was followed by Sankhamhit, (2009) and Daruvu hit,(2012) 

Siva achieved huge success when he progressed to Tamil cinema, where he entered as a screenwriter and director with Siruthai (2011). He further made the high-prolific Tamil films Veeram (2014), Vedalam (2015) & Viswasam (2019) . He also directed Vivegam (2017) & Annaatthe (2021)

Early life and family
Siva was born to documentary film director M. Jayakumar in Chennai, Tamil Nadu, India. He is the grandson of producer and writer A. K. Velan. He is a descendant of the Thanjavur Nayaks. His brother Bala is an actor in Tamil and Malayalam films.

Career
Although he always wanted to become a filmmaker, he pursued photography. In 1998, Siva became a gold medalist from M.G.R. Government Film and Television Training Institute He went on to work with cinematographer Jayanan Vincent. Siva then came to Hyderabad to work for Venkatesh's film Jayam Manade Raa (2000) as an operative cameraman. In 2002, he became an independent cinematographer, shortly after his brother Bala, made his acting debut. He has shot for about 15 films since then.

In 2008, he narrated a script to actor Gopichand who agreed to play the lead role. Souryam, co-starring Gopichand along with Anushka Shetty was Siva's directorial debut. The following year, Siva made his second film, again with Gopichand in the lead. In 2011, Siva made his debut as a director in Tamil cinema with Siruthai, a remake of S. S. Rajamouli's Telugu action masala Vikramarkudu. The film, featuring Karthi in the starring role, went on to become a high commercial success, which led to him being referred to as "Siruthai" Siva in Tamil cinema from then on. His fourth directorial, Daruvu, released in May 2012.

In December 2011, Siva was signed by Vijaya Productions to direct a film for their centenary year with Ajith Kumar signed on to play the leading role. Ajith Kumar requested Siva to make it as a rural story and production began in 2013. He directed Veeram (2014) with in the lead role which became a blockbuster hit. His third film in Tamil titled Vedhalam (2015) starring Ajith alongside an ensemble cast including Shruti Hassan and Rahul Dev movie was a mass entertainer. His fourth film in Tamil titled Vivegam (2017) was again with Ajith Kumar. It released in August 2017 to mixed responses. His next movie with Ajith Kumar, Viswasam (2019), which was produced by Sathya Jyothi Films, became a huge hit despite releasing along with Petta. His next film Annaatthe starring Rajinikanth released on 4 November 2021 coinciding with Diwali which was superhit

Filmography 
As cinematographer

As director and screenwriter

As lyricist

As actor
Manadhai Thirudivittai (2001)

References

External links
 
 

Film directors from Chennai
Living people
Telugu film directors
Tamil film directors
Tamil film cinematographers
M.G.R. Government Film and Television Training Institute alumni
Telugu film cinematographers
Tamil screenwriters
Cinematographers from Tamil Nadu
1977 births